Beatrice Dömeland (born 4 August 1973) was a German female volleyball player. She was part of the Germany women's national volleyball team.

She competed with the national team at the 2000 Summer Olympics in Sydney, Australia, finishing 6th. 
She played also at the 1998 FIVB Volleyball Women's World Championship, at the 2002 FIVB Volleyball Women's World Championship in Germany, On club level she played with Dresdner SC. and at the 2003 Women's European Volleyball Championship.

Clubs
 Dresdner SC (2002)

See also
 Germany at the 2000 Summer Olympics

References

External links
 
 http://www.cev.lu/Competition-Area/PlayerDetails.aspx?TeamID=714&PlayerID=20703&ID=44
 https://www.munzinger.de/search/portrait/Beatrice+D%C3%B6meland/1/5266.html
 http://www.gettyimages.com.au/photos/beatrice-d%C3%B6meland?excludenudity=true&sort=mostpopular&mediatype=photography&phrase=beatrice%20d%C3%B6meland

1973 births
Living people
German women's volleyball players
Sportspeople from Magdeburg
Volleyball players at the 2000 Summer Olympics
Olympic volleyball players of Germany
Place of birth missing (living people)